The following is a list of National Collegiate Athletic Association (NCAA) Division II college soccer teams that have qualified for the NCAA Division II Men's Soccer Championship through the 2019 tournament with teams listed by number of appearances. From 1959 through 1971, the NCAA had only one division for soccer; the Division II tournament was started in 1972, and the Division III tourney followed in 1974.

All programs are listed with their current athletic brand names, which do not always match those in use in a specific season.

Schools in Italics no longer compete in Division II.

† = Appearance vacated by the NCAA.

See also
NCAA Division I Men's Soccer Tournament appearances by school

References

External links 
 NCAA Men's Division II Soccer

NCAA Division II Men's Soccer Championship